The NBL Canada draft is an annual event in which each team from the National Basketball League of Canada (NBL) can draft players who are eligible and wish to join the league. Most of these players previously played college basketball in U Sports or the NCAA. Before becoming eligible, the players must participate in a pre-draft combine, and the list of players that will attend the draft is officially decided.

Teams are allowed to trade picks during the draft as well. In 2012, the Summerside Storm received a first and third-round pick from the Halifax Rainmen in exchange for Troy Gottselig. This was the first recorded incident of such a kind. It is also typical for teams to make trades following the event. The most notable occurrence was Halifax's acquisition of Brandon Robinson, the reigning scoring champion and a future All-Star, from the Oshawa Power in 2012 for a future draft pick.

The first pick is, on most occasions, awarded to the team that finished with the worst record in the previous season. Teams may be allowed to select earlier in the case that they make a trade during or prior to the event. Only one first overall draft pick, Alex Johnson, previously played at an NCAA Division I school. Johnson attended North Carolina State University.

List of drafts and first overall picks

See also 
Draft bust

References 

Recurring sporting events established in 2011